Argyrotaenia niscana is a species of moth of the family Tortricidae. It is found in the United States, where it has been recorded from California and Mississippi.

The wingspan is about 14–16 mm. Adults have been recorded on wing from March to June, in August and in October.

The larvae feed on Adenostoma species, including Adenostoma fasciculatum.

References

Moths described in 1907
niscana
Moths of North America